Garth Jennings (born 9 July 1972) is an English director, screenwriter and actor. Films he has directed include The Hitchhiker's Guide to the Galaxy, Son of Rambow, Sing, and Sing 2. He co-founded the production company Hammer & Tongs.

Career

Hammer and Tongs 

In 1993, Garth Jennings co-founded the production company Hammer & Tongs alongside Dominic Leung and Nick Goldsmith. The production company was primarily responsible for directing and writing music videos. Their music video for Radiohead's song "Lotus Flower" earned Jennings a nomination at the 54th Annual Grammy Awards.

The Hitchhiker's Guide to the Galaxy 
Garth Jennings directed a number of films including the 2005 science fiction comedy film The Hitchhiker's Guide to the Galaxy, based upon previous works in the media franchise of the same name, created by Douglas Adams. It stars Martin Freeman, Sam Rockwell, Mos Def, Zooey Deschanel and the voices of Stephen Fry, Helen Mirren and Alan Rickman.

Son of Rambow 
Set over a summer during the dawn of Thatcher's Britain, Son of Rambow is a coming of age story about two schoolboys and their attempts to make an amateur film inspired by First Blood. The film premiered on 22 January 2007 at the Sundance Film Festival. It was later shown at the Newport Beach Film Festival, Seattle International Film Festival, Toronto International Film Festival and Glasgow Film Festival. The film was also shown at the 51st BFI London Film Festival. Son of Rambow was released in the United Kingdom on 4 April 2008 and opened in limited release in the United States on 2 May 2008.

Sing 
In January 2014, it was announced that Garth Jennings would write and direct an animated comedy film for Universal Pictures and Illumination Entertainment. The resulting film, Sing, was released in December 2016. He also provided the voice for Miss Crawly, an elderly iguana employed as an administrative assistant to Buster Moon. A sequel, titled Sing 2, was released on 22 December 2021.

Madame 
Garth Jennings directed, wrote and co-produced a short film titled Madame that was released in 2019. This film takes place inside a grand Parisian apartment where lives an elegant elderly lady. And inside this lady lives a monster.

Filmography

Films

Acting credits

Music videos

Awards and nominations

Books

References

External links 

1972 births
Living people
British screenwriters
Comedy film directors
British voice actors
Illumination (company) people